Lukáš Martinka (born 28 October 1986 in Trenčín) is a Slovak former professional ice hockey player.

Martinka played five games for HC Slavia Praha of the Czech Extraliga during the 2008–09 season. He also played in the Tisport liga for MHk 32 Liptovský Mikuláš and MsHK Žilina and the Kazakhstan Hockey Championship for Arystan Temirtau and Kulager Petropavl.

References

External links

1986 births
Living people
Arystan Temirtau players
Bisons de Neuilly-sur-Marne players
HC Dukla Jihlava players
Dunaújvárosi Acélbikák players
BK Havlíčkův Brod players
GKS Katowice (ice hockey) players
Kokkolan Hermes players
Kulager Petropavl players
Lempäälän Kisa players
MHk 32 Liptovský Mikuláš players
HC Slavia Praha players
Slovak ice hockey defencemen
Sportspeople from Trenčín
Val-d'Or Foreurs players
KH Zagłębie Sosnowiec players
MsHK Žilina players
Slovak expatriate ice hockey players in Canada
Slovak expatriate ice hockey players in the Czech Republic
Slovak expatriate ice hockey players in Finland
Expatriate ice hockey players in France
Expatriate ice hockey players in Austria
Expatriate ice hockey players in Hungary
Expatriate ice hockey players in Kazakhstan
Expatriate ice hockey players in Poland
Slovak expatriate sportspeople in France
Slovak expatriate sportspeople in Austria
Slovak expatriate sportspeople in Hungary
Slovak expatriate sportspeople in Kazakhstan
Slovak expatriate sportspeople in Poland